Atomic Clock Ensemble in Space (ACES) is a project led by the European Space Agency which will place ultra-stable atomic clocks on the International Space Station. Operation in the microgravity environment of the ISS will provide a stable and accurate time base for different areas of research, including general relativity and string theory tests, time and frequency metrology, and very long baseline interferometry.

The payload actually contains two clocks: a caesium laser cooled atomic clock (PHARAO) developed by CNES, France for long-term stability and an active hydrogen maser (SHM) developed by Spectratime, Switzerland for short-term stability.
The onboard frequency comparison between PHARAO and SHM will be a key element for the evaluation of the accuracy and the short/medium-term stability of the PHARAO clock. Further, it will allow to identify the optimal operating conditions for PHARAO and to select a compromise between frequency accuracy and stability.
The mission will also be a test-bed for the space qualification of the active hydrogen maser SHM. After optimisation performances in the  range  for  both  frequency  instability  and  inaccuracy  are intended. This corresponds to a time error of about 1 second over 300 million years.

After earlier plans for launch readiness in 2012, the clock ensemble was expected to travel to the space station aboard a SpaceX Falcon 9 in 2021.  Major delays due to difficulties in the development and test of the active hydrogen maser and the time transfer microwave system have extended the launch to 2025.  The ACES module will be externally mounted to the ESA's Columbus Laboratory
 with an 18-30 month expected operations phase.

See also
Scientific research on the ISS
European contribution to the International Space Station

References

External links 
 ACES factsheet by the ESA (PDF)

International Space Station experiments
Columbus (ISS module)
Space science
Atomic clocks
European Space Agency